Playlist: The Very Best of Alan Jackson is the eighth greatest hits compilation album by American country music artist Alan Jackson. It is part of a series of similar Playlist albums issued by Legacy Recordings. The album features thirteen of Jackson's singles spanning from "Here in the Real World" in 1990 to "Monday Morning Church" from "Who I Am" in 2004. Also included is "Never Loved Before", a duet with Martina McBride from Jackson's 2008 album Good Time.

Critical reception
Stephen Thomas Erlewine of Allmusic gave the album four stars out of five, calling it "a good sampling of [Jackson's] new millennium staples."

Commercial performance
Playlist: The Very Best of Alan Jackson peaked at number 19 on the U.S. Billboard Top Country Albums chart. It also peaked at number 146 on the Billboard 200. The album has sold 266,100 copies in the United States as of October 2019.

Track listing

Charts

References

2012 compilation albums
Alan Jackson compilation albums
Jackson, Alan